Urban Decay is a 2007 horror film directed by Harry Basil and starring Dean Cain.

Plot 
Cab driver Stan slams into a homeless man who gets up and walks away, leaving behind a scarf covered with writhing maggots. Obsessed with the mystery, Stan hunts the figure through the city, discovering a trail of mangled, half-eaten victims, and an urban legend: Puss Head was a sewer worker who came back from an uncharted tunnel changed into something both living and dead. Parents warn their children that the shuffling zombie will get them if they stay out on the streets too late. But as the body count rises, Stan finds that the legend is alive and hungry.

Cast
 Dean Cain as Stan
 Brooke Burns as Sasha
 Chris Williams as "2-Much"
 Ryan Francis as "E-Nuff"
 Tim Thomerson as Detective Thompson
Meat Loaf as Rick "Zero"

Release 
The film was offered for distribution at the Marché du Film.

References

External links 

American zombie films
2007 films
2007 horror films
Films directed by Harry Basil
2000s English-language films
2000s American films